Joyce Alene Byers Johnston, (May 17, 1934 – May 10, 2017) was an American songwriter best known for her work with Elvis Presley. She wrote Timi Yuro's 1962 hit "What's A Matter Baby".

She was married to the music producer Bob Johnston.  In later years, Johnston claimed that some songs credited to his wife Joy Byers were actually co-written, or solely written by himself.

Select discography
 1965, "Please Don't Stop Loving Me", from the 1966 film Frankie and Johnny, writer
 1964, "It Hurts Me", writer
 1964, "When You Loved Me", writer
 1964, "She Was My Baby (He Was My Friend)", writer
 1963, "C'mon Everybody" from the musical film Viva Las Vegas, writer
 1967, "Let Yourself Go" from the 1968 film Speedway, writer

References

External links
 Joy Byers on Elvis.com
 Joy Byers credits on AllMusic

American women songwriters
1934 births
2017 deaths
21st-century American women